In music, Op. 37 stands for Opus number 37. Compositions that are assigned this number include:

 Arensky – Raphael
 Beethoven – Piano Concerto No. 3
 Chausson – Chanson perpétuelle
 Chopin – Nocturnes, Op. 37
 Dohnányi – Sextet
 Dvořák – The Cunning Peasant
 Elgar – Sea Pictures
 Khanon – The Shagreen Bone
 Lyapunov – Zelazowa Wola
 Prokofiev – The Fiery Angel
 Rachmaninoff – All-Night Vigil
 Saint-Saëns – Romance
 Schumann – Gedichte aus "Liebesfrühling"
 Szymanowski – String Quartet No. 1
 Tchaikovsky – Piano Sonata in G major
 Tchaikovsky – The Seasons
 Vieuxtemps – Violin Concerto No. 5